Samuel Takáč (born 3 December 1991) is a Slovak professional ice hockey player for HC Slovan Bratislava of the Slovak Extraliga.

Career statistics

Regular season and playoffs
Bold indicates led league

International

Awards and honors

References

External links

 

1991 births
Living people
Slovak ice hockey centres
Sportspeople from Poprad
HK Poprad players
HK Dukla Michalovce players
Rapaces de Gap players
LHC Les Lions players
HC Slovan Bratislava players
Ice hockey players at the 2022 Winter Olympics
Olympic ice hockey players of Slovakia
Medalists at the 2022 Winter Olympics
Olympic bronze medalists for Slovakia
Olympic medalists in ice hockey
Expatriate ice hockey players in France
Slovak expatriate ice hockey people
Slovak expatriate sportspeople in France